The totenkopf (German for death's head or skull) is a military symbol.

Totenkopf may also refer to:

 Totenkopf (High Tauern), a mountain in the Glockner Group of the High Tauern range in Austria
 Totenkopf (hill), the highest point in the Kaiserstuhl region, Baden-Württemberg, Germany
 Totenkopf (Sauerland), a hill in the Sauerland, North Rhine-Westphalia
 , a hill saddle in the Palatine Forest, Rhineland-Palatinate, Germany
 Totenkopf (Hainich), a hill of Thuringia, Germany

See also

 SS-Totenkopfverbände
 3rd SS Panzer Division Totenkopf